Tsunami is a 2021 Indian Malayalam-language romantic comedy film directed by Lal and Lal Jr. and written by Lal. The film stars Balu Varghese, Innocent, Mukesh, Suresh Krishna, Aju Varghese, and Aaradya Ann. The film follows Bobby, a young man who ends up in struggling situation with a women, which is followed by their marriage.

Tsunami was released on 11 March 2021.

Plot 
Bobby is a young man who goes to a seminary in Goa to become a priest, despite his family opposes that. But during his journey he ends up going to the bathroom while the bus stops for a break and by chance happen to enter a ladies toilet. Anna, a girl comes and opens the door when he had taken off his pants leaving the girl and Bobby both scared. Her relatives take her from there seeing her scared and shouting while her mother returns to the bathroom to see Bobby hiding his face and running from there. She pursue him to beat him up but he outrun her. Feeling sad he ends up not going to seminary and return home. Bobby decided to marry Anna. Then the family decides to get him married according to their wishes.  But the effect of the events of that journey do not leave him and he ends up in trouble after marriage.

Cast 
 Balu Varghese as Boby Francis
 Aradhya Ann as Anna
 Innocent as Eepachan, Anna's father
 Mukesh as Fr. Sylvester (Achankochapi), Boby's uncle
 Suresh Krishna as Francis, Boby's Father
 Aju Varghese as Antony a.k.a. Andy, Boby's cousin
 Devi Ajith as Jolly Francis, Boby's Mother
 Valsala Menon as Molly, Andy's Wife
 Nisha Joseph as Jacintha Eapen, Anna's mother
 Sinoj Varghese as Vasu
 Arun as C.I.Bernard, Anna's Uncle
 Sminu Sijo

Reception 
The Times of India gave it a rating of 3 out of 5 stars. Samayam Malayalam gave 2.5 out of 5 stars. Filmibeat.com and Dool News gave it negative reviews for its plot and adult humour.

References

2021 films
2020s Malayalam-language films
Indian sex comedy films
Films shot in Goa
2020s sex comedy films
2021 comedy films
Films directed by Lal